Patricia Ozanne (31 July 1923 - 11 February 2009) was a Guernsey-born English rally driver who competed from 1953 to 1973. She won the ladies' award at the 1961 London Rally and at the 1970 Sherry Rally in Spain.

Rally results

References

External links
 Patricia Ozanne eWRC
 Pat Ozanne eWRC
 Tish Ozanne eWRC

English rally drivers
Guernsey sportswomen
Female rally drivers
1923 births
2009 deaths
English female racing drivers